"I Feel Loved" is a song by English electronic group Depeche Mode. It was released on 30 July 2001 as the second single from the album Exciter. In 2002 The song was nominated for two Grammy Awards. One for Best Dance Recording and the Danny Tenaglia Remix for Best Remixed Recording, but lost out to Janet Jackson's "All for You" and to Deep Dish's remix of Dido's "Thank You".

Music video
There are four versions, one that uses the "Single Version", but with a cold ending, rather than the fading out ending. There are remix videos by Dan-O-Rama, a long version, and a short version. The two remix versions are composed of modified production shots of the original video. The original version wasn't released on a public video until The Best Of: Volume 1 was released in 2006. The other two aren't on a public release. A version using the Danny Tenaglia Radio Edit of the song also exists, but was pulled from the official website and the label's effort to promote it were scrapped.

The original video features Depeche Mode performing in a club. The setting makes for a hot, sweaty ambience. The club is approached by a set of K9 police, with dogs snapping and angry (for what purpose is unclear). The site security only smiles and lets the policemen by. The audience seems unaware of the snapping, snarling dogs – and the dogs slowly give in to a loving temperament, licking those that pay attention to them. This seems to suggest that the club is full of love and affects all who enter.

B-Side 
The B-side is a cover of the The Stooges song 'Dirt', Martin Gore stated on the 101 commentary track. "Over the years, we haven't really covered too many songs. We covered "Dirt" by The Stooges on one of our B-sides recently. I just think that he always had a sense of humour and this darkness to his music at the same time, which is a hard thing to marry, and I think he always has done that really well."

Track listings

"I Feel Loved" written by Martin L. Gore
"Dirt" written by Ron Asheton, Scott Asheton, Dave Alexander and Iggy Pop
Remixed by US producer Chris Jackson, a.k.a. cjax

Charts

Weekly charts

Year-end charts

References

External links
 Single information from the official Depeche Mode web site
 Allmusic review

2001 singles
2001 songs
Depeche Mode songs
Mute Records singles
Songs written by Martin Gore
UK Independent Singles Chart number-one singles